Canpadore Parish, Yanda County in Bourke Shire is a civil parish of Yanda County, a cadasteral division of New South Wales;  a Cadastral division of New South Wales.

Geography

The Parish is in the Darling River floodplain upstream of Wilcannia, New South Wales;  a Cadastral division of New South Wales. and is located at 30°46′53″S 144°49′26″E.

The topography is flat with a Köppen climate classification of BsK (Hot semi arid).

The economy in the parish is based on broad acre agriculture, mainly Wheat, and sheep.

History
The traditional owners of the area are the Barkindji people, and the first European to the area was Major Mitchells expedition.

References

Central West (New South Wales)
Towns in New South Wales
Localities in New South Wales
Geography of New South Wales
Populated places in New South Wales